Lallio is a comune (municipality) in the Province of Bergamo in the Italian region of Lombardy, located about  northeast of Milan and about  southwest of Bergamo.

Lallio borders the following municipalities: Bergamo, Dalmine, Stezzano, Treviolo.

Demographic evolution

Companies
The company Santini Maglificio Sportivo is based in Lallio, which produces the Santini SMS cycling clothes.

Twin towns — sister cities
Lallio is twinned with:

  Schöngeising, Germany

References

External links
 www.comune.lallio.bg.it/